Olle Oskar Axelsson (December 1, 1913 – September 15, 1980) was a Swedish bobsledder who competed in the 1950s. Competing in two Winter Olympics, he earned his best finish of eighth in the two-man event at Oslo in 1952.

Four years later he finished 16th in the four-man event as well as 17th in the two-man event at the 1956 Winter Olympics.

He was born and died in Stockholm.

References
1952 bobsleigh two-man results
1956 bobsleigh two-man results
Bobsleigh four-man result: 1948-64

1913 births
1980 deaths
Swedish male bobsledders
Olympic bobsledders of Sweden
Bobsledders at the 1952 Winter Olympics
Bobsledders at the 1956 Winter Olympics
Sportspeople from Stockholm
20th-century Swedish people